The 1970 Nebraska gubernatorial election was held on November 3, 1970, and featured businessman James Exon, a Democrat, defeating incumbent Republican Governor Norbert Tiemann.

Democratic primary

Candidates
Julius W. Burbach, member of the Nebraska Legislature
James Exon, businessman and Chairman of the Nebraska Democratic Party
Richard R. Larsen, former state Treasurer

Results

Republican primary

Candidates
Clifton B. Batchelder, member of the Nebraska Legislature
Harvey Grotzky, retired interior decorator
Norbert Tiemann, incumbent Governor

Results

General election

Results

References

Gubernatorial
1970
Nebraska